was a Japanese film director known for his stylish and popular Roman Porno films for Nikkatsu, particularly the first two installments of the Angel Guts series. Despite a somewhat uneven career, many mainstream critics consider Sone the best of Nikkatsu's Roman Porno directors.

Life and career
Chūsei Sone majored in Art History at Tohoku University, and graduated in 1962. Soon after graduation, he began work as an Assistant director at Nikkatsu studios, where he worked with Seijun Suzuki. Suzuki's directing style was to have a lasting influence on Sone's own later work. In their Japanese Cinema Encyclopedia: The Sex Films, the Weissers compare Suzuki and Sone, writing, "Sone's films are riddled with quirky characters and surrealistic metaphors, but unlike the works of Suzuki, these movies are much more linear, plot driven, and ultimately crowd pleasing."

When Nikkatsu started their Roman Porno series of mainstream theatrical softcore pornographic films in November 1971, Sone was quickly given his chance to direct. His first film was the historical sex-film, Eros Schedule Book: Female Artist (1971). He directed several more films set in historical time periods such as Erotic Story: The Peony Lantern (1972), which became a mainstream hit and won several film industry awards. Later in 1972, Sone switched to contemporary themes with Lusty Sisters, but would return to the period-piece with his popular action-sex film starring Nikkatsu queen Junko Miyashita, Female Ninja Magic: 100 Trampled Flowers (1974).

By the late 1970s, Sone had become associated with a more violent style of eroticism in such films as My Sex Report: Climax Point (1976) and Shinjuku Mixed-Up Street: Wait Till I Come (1977). When Nikkatsu decided to film Takashi Ishii's Angel Guts manga, Sone was a logical choice to helm the first two episodes of the series, Angel Guts: High School Coed (1978) and Angel Guts: Red Classroom (1979). Sone was given a Best Director award at the Yokohama Film Festival for Angel Guts: Red Classroom, and the film also won Best Actress and Best Supporting Actor at the ceremony. Director Toshiharu Ikeda, who worked as Sone's screenwriter and an assistant director on Angel Guts: High School Coed, said, of Sone, "He is simply a genius. He really is a true genius... We were all tremendously influenced by him." Of the Angel Guts series, Ikeda comments, "That series definitely had an impact on Roman Porno history, as well as on the audience."

Throughout his career Sone directed many films of lesser quality, such as Overly Ripe Breasts (1973), Modern Prostitution: Lust Under A Uniform (1974) and 100 High School Girls: Secret Motel Report (1975). Nevertheless, his ability to continue to create stylish, innovative and popular films kept his reputation high.

By this point, Eiga Geijutsu magazine reported that Sone was dissatisfied with his work in the Roman Porno genre, and wanted to make other films, but that he needed the income these Nikkatsu films provided. Nikkatsu gave Sone the chance to direct the non-Roman Porno series of light comedies, Glory Cheerleaders (1976–1977), which became popular hits. While continuing to direct for Nikkatsu at this time, Sone worked for independent studios where he could enjoy more creative freedom, and not be tied to the pink film format. Hakata Kids' Innocence (1977), a simple story of one day in the lives of three junior high boys, is one such film. Following the success of Red Violation (1980), Sone took a full break from pink films for three years to try other projects. He returned to the genre with the successful sex-mystery, Demon's Room (1982). Together with director Mamoru Watanabe, Sone started the Film Workers Production Company in 1982 as an outlet for more mainstream projects.

After Tattoo (1984), based on a Tanizaki novel, Sone left Nikkatsu until 1986, when the studio gave him a relatively large budget to direct Adultery. Today judged one of his best works, the film was ignored by audiences and critics at the time because of the inferior quality of many films in the Roman Porno series of the mid-1980s. Sone directed a mainstream hit, Flying, in (1988) and then retired from directing.

He died on 26 August 2014 in Usuki, Ōita, from pneumonia.

Filmography
  - writer (dir. Seijun Suzuki) (1967-06-15)
  - writer (dir: Teruo Ishii) (1970-06-20)
  (1971-12-18)
 {{nihongo|Love Bandit Rat Man a.k.a. Love Bandit Nezumi Kozo|性盗ねずみ小僧|Seitou Nezumi Kozo}} (1972-01-29)
  (1972-03-18)
  (1972-04-29)
  (1972-06-28)
  (1972-09-16)
  (1972-11-29)
  (1973-02-03)
  (1973-02-21)
  (1973-05-31)
  (1973-07-04)
  (1973-08-25)
  (1973-11-20)
  (1974-01-26)
  (1974-02-16)
  (1974-08-03)
  (1974-08-28)
  (1975-04-12)
  (1975-06-04)
  (1975-08-23)
  (1975-10-18)
  (1976-02-21)
  (1976-05-15)
 嗚呼！！花の応援団 Ah!! Hana no Oh-endan (1976-08-21)
 嗚呼！！花の応援団　役者やのォー Ahh!! Hana no Oh-endan: Yakusha ya Noh (1976-12-25
 不連続殺人事件 Furenzoku Satsujin Jiken (Arts Theatre Guild) - also writer (1977-03-15)
 嗚呼！！花の応援団　男涙の親衛隊 Ah!! Hana no Oh-endan: Otoko Namida no Shineitai (1977-03-19)
 新宿乱れ街　いくまで待って Shinjuku Midaregai: Ikumade Matte (1977-09-17)
  (1978-02-04)
  (1978-03-18)
  (1978-07-22)
 博多っ子純情 Hakatakko Junjo (LAL company) (1978-12-02)
  (also writer) (1979-01-06)
 Supergun Lady Wani Bunsho (スーパーＧＵＮレディ ワニ分署) 1979-08-18
  (1980-01-05)
 元祖大四畳半大物語 (co-directed with 松本零士) 1980-08-16
 太陽のきずあと 　東映セントラルフィルム (Toei Central Film) (1981-02-14)
  (1982-04-23)
  (1984-04-20)
  (1984-12-22)
  - producer (K Enterprise) (dir. Masayuki Asao) (1985-08-24)
  (1986-10-31)
 Flying (1988)
  (2000)

References

Sources
 "Chusei Sone". 2005. in Angel Guts - The Nikkatsu Series - 5 Disc Collector's Edition ATU 017. Disc one: High School Co-ed. Biographies.
 
 
 Ikeda, Toshiharu. Jasper Sharp, interviewer. Sharon  Hayashi, translator. 2005. An Insight into Chusei Sone in Angel Guts - The Nikkatsu Series - 5 Disc Collector's Edition. www.artsmagicdvd.com ATU 017. Disc one: High School Co-ed''. Interviews.
 

1937 births
2014 deaths
Japanese film directors
Pink film directors
Tohoku University alumni
People from Gunma Prefecture
Deaths from pneumonia in Japan